Katalin Tuschák (born 13 June 1959) is a Hungarian fencer, who won a bronze medal in the team foil competition at the 1988 Summer Olympics in Seoul together with Zsuzsanna Szőcs, Zsuzsanna Jánosi, Edit Kovács and Gertrúd Stefanek.

References

External links
Katalin Tuschák on sport-reference.com

1959 births
Living people
Hungarian female foil fencers
Fencers at the 1988 Summer Olympics
Olympic fencers of Hungary
Olympic bronze medalists for Hungary
Olympic medalists in fencing
Martial artists from Budapest
Medalists at the 1988 Summer Olympics
20th-century Hungarian women